Eaton Canyon is a major canyon beginning at the Eaton Saddle near Mount Markham and San Gabriel Peak in the San Gabriel Mountains in the Angeles National Forest, United States. Its drainage flows into the Rio Hondo river and then into the Los Angeles River. It is named after Judge Benjamin S. Eaton, who lived in the Fair Oaks Ranch House in 1865 not far from Eaton Creek.

The most well-known portion of the canyon is the Eaton Canyon Nature Center in Pasadena, California. The trailhead of the Mount Wilson Toll Road is in the canyon.

History
Eaton Canyon is in the foothills of the San Gabriel Mountains. Originally called "El Precipicio" by the Spanish settlers because of its steep gorges, the canyon falls under several governmental jurisdictions.

Benjamin Eaton was hired by Don Benito Wilson to bring water to the Fair Oaks Ranch. In August 1877, naturalist John Muir set out from Pasadena for an expedition into the San Gabriels. He writes: "On the first day of my excursion I went only as far as the mouth of Eaton Canyon, because the heat was oppressive, and a pair of new shoes were chafing my feet to such an extent that walking began to be painful."

In October 1993, the Kinneloa Fire, begun accidentally on the slopes above Eaton Canyon, burned much of the area as well as more than a hundred homes in neighboring Altadena and Kinneloa Mesa as part of a rash of late October wildfires driven by Santa Ana winds in Southern California. One man died of complications from smoke inhalation and dozens were injured. After briefly serving as the incident command post for the fire, the Eaton Canyon Nature Center was destroyed. It was rebuilt in 1998.

Landmarks

Eaton Canyon Natural Area Park

The Eaton Canyon Natural Area Park is located where the mountain stream debouches into the foothill wash at the base of the San Gabriel Mountains. The park is administered by the Los Angeles County Department of Parks and Recreation. The county administers the lower two-thirds of the area below the toll road bridge. Most of the 190 acres (0.8 km2) that comprises the natural area lie on the northern boundaries of the old Rancho San Pascual and Rancho Santa Anita on land designated for the Southern Pacific Railroad. Once the railroad gave up the land, it was opened for homesteading. The nature center is unique in the area because it houses exhibits that educate on the flora and fauna local to the San Gabriel Valley Southern California. The center was rebuilt in 1998 after the 1993 fire destroyed the previous facility.

Pasadena and parts of Altadena receive about 40% of their water from local sources. The upper third is controlled by the Water Department of the City of Pasadena.
  - Eaton Canyon Park

Eaton Canyon Falls

The falls are where the Eaton Creek has a fifty-foot drop and are located north of the bridge in the part of the canyon administered by the US Forest Service. John Muir once described the waterfall as "a charming little thing, with a low, sweet voice, singing like a bird, as it pours from a notch in a short ledge, some thirty or forty feet into a round mirror-pool."

Several waterfalls also exist above Eaton Fall, which are more secluded. Until 1979, there was a tunnel which allowed access, but this has been dynamited and filled in. While the upper falls were accessible decades ago, there are no longer any maintained trails. People have been injured and killed trying to make these climbs via unofficial trails.

In 2011, a man fell to his death on the hike to the falls. Another man fell to his death one week later. In 2013, two hikers attempted to climb to the second waterfall, but decided against it mid-climb. As they were coming down, they both lost their footing and fell. One hiker fell to her death, and the other was airlifted to a hospital.

On June 27, 2014, the US Forest Service announced plans to close the trail to the upper falls. The trail to the upper falls was closed off on August 1, 2014. Violators caught trespassing the off-limits area will face a fine of up to $5,000 or six months in jail. Members of the Coalition of American Canyoneers would like access to the area that is closed.
  - Eaton Canyon falls

Golf course
The Eaton Canyon Golf Course is a regulation 9-hole course featuring narrow fairways and rolling terrain. It is administered by the Los Angeles County Department of Parks and Recreation and has been open since 1962.

It was originally planned as an eighteen-hole facility and was designed by famed golf course architect, William Francis Bell (known as Billy Bell Jr., son of famed golf course designer, William Park Bell). Opening day ceremonies included a golf outing with dignitaries and local golf professionals, including 1961 PGA Champion, Jerry Barber.

  - Eaton Canyon Park Golf Course

Mount Wilson Toll Road

The Mount Wilson Toll Road (1891–1936) is a historic roadway  which ascended Mount Wilson via a vehicular passable road from the base of the foothills in Altadena. It was accessible from Pasadena via Santa Anita Avenue which drove right to the front porch of the toll house. The road is still accessible from Pinecrest Drive, just off Altadena Drive in Altadena. Access was blocked after a 2005 landslide destroyed 50 yards of the road, but the road has since been rebuilt and reopened.

Mount Wilson had always been active with human passage starting from the days of the local Indians. It was Benjamin Davis Wilson who established a proper trail to the summit of Mt. Wilson from Sierra Madre through the Santa Anita Canyon. The Mt. Wilson Toll Road to Henninger Flats is controlled by the Forester and Fire Warden of the Los Angeles County Fire Department.
  - Mt. Wilson Toll Road trail head

Eaton Wash

Emerging from the foothills and flowing south, the Eaton Creek becomes the Eaton Wash, whose drainage flows into the Rio Hondo river and then into the Los Angeles River. The wash is one of the Altadena streams that helps to feed to Raymond Basin.  Rubio, Las Flores and others all flow to the east eventually to join the Rio Hondo. Millard Canyon on the west flows to the Arroyo Seco. Eaton Wash is one of the two major streams that channels storm water in Pasadena; the other is the Arroyo Seco on the western side of the city.

On its way to the Rio Hondo, the Eaton Wash is joined by the combined drainages from Pasadena Glen and Hastings Canyons.  These channels have all been modified by flood control dams near the base of the mountains, and both have been confined to manmade channels or storm drains in their lower reaches. Typically the Eaton Wash and Arroyo Seco carry very little water. Peak discharges are typically less than 1,000 ft3/s (30 m3/s) for Arroyo Seco and less than 500 ft3/s (15 m3/s) for Eaton Wash.

  - Eaton Wash, USGS El Monte (CA)

Eaton Canyon Reservoir and Dam
Eaton Wash Reservoir and the Eaton Wash Dam were built in 1937 and are controlled by the Los Angeles County Department of Public Works. It has a surface area of 54 acres (220,000 m2) and drains an area of 9.47 square miles (25 km2). Its primary usage is for flood control and debris storage.
  - Eaton Canyon Reservoir
  - Eaton Wash Dam

See also
 Angeles National Forest Fire Lookout Association
 California chaparral and woodlands

References

External links

 
 "MyEatonCanyon".
 
 
 
 
  
  
 
 

San Gabriel Mountains
Parks in Los Angeles County, California
Canyons and gorges of California
Landforms of Los Angeles County, California
Nature centers in California
Altadena, California
Geography of Pasadena, California
Geography of the San Gabriel Valley
Angeles National Forest
Tributaries of the Los Angeles River
Washes of California
County government agencies in California
Tourist attractions in Pasadena, California